DeWeese Reservoir is located in northern Custer County, Colorado between the Sangre de Cristo Mountains and the Wet Mountains. The reservoir is owned by the DeWeese-Dye Ditch and Reservoir Company, which uses the water it stores to irrigate agricultural crops around Lincoln Park and Brookside in Fremont County, Colorado.

The ditch and reservoir company owns the land under the reservoir and most of the land around it. The company has arrangements with other organizations to store water and for the use of the space. For example, it stores  for Colorado Parks and Wildlife, it stores  for the Bureau of Land Management (which also owns some land near the reservoir), and it stores some water for the Upper Arkansas Water Conservancy District and the Round Mountain Water District, a local water company.

State wildlife area
The lake and the land immediately surrounding it are also designated as the DeWeese Reservoir State Wildlife Area. It offers coldwater stream and lake fishing, hunting, and picnicking, hiking, wildlife viewing, and camping.

References

External links
DeWeese Reservoir State Wildlife Area (includes map)
DeWeese-Dye Ditch and Reservoir Company

Reservoirs in Colorado
Lakes of Custer County, Colorado
Protected areas of Custer County, Colorado
Wildlife management areas of Colorado